SS Monagas was a Venezuelan tanker that was torpedoed by the  in the Gulf of Venezuela  west of Punta Macollawest on 16 February 1942 while she was travelling from Maracaibo, Venezuela to Aruba while carrying a cargo of oil products.

Construction 
Monagas was built at the Palmer's Shipbuilding & Iron Co. Ltd. shipyard in Newcastle upon Tyne, United Kingdom in August 1927, where she was launched and completed that same year. The ship could generate 212 nominal horsepower with a speed of  thanks to her two boilers.

Sinking 
The ship came to a standstill and only slightly settled in the water by the stern. Because she did not sink, the U-boat fired another torpedo at the ship 14 minutes after the first one as a coup de grâce, hitting her again aft on the port side underneath the funnel. This attack broke the ships back which set her ablaze and made her develop a heavy list, but still did not sink her.

Wreck 

References

1927 ships
Tankers
Steamships of Venezuela
World War II shipwrecks in the Atlantic Ocean
Ships built in the United Kingdom
Maritime incidents in February 1942
Ships sunk by German submarines in World War II